Mario Gallo (March 22, 1923 – October 30, 1984) was an American film and television actor. He was perhaps best known for playing Mario in the 1980 film Raging Bull, and also played Tomaso Delvecchio in the American drama television series Delvecchio.

Life and career 
Gallo was born in Brooklyn, New York. He worked in New York, moving to Los Angeles, California in the 1950s. Gallo guest-starred in television programs including Peter Gunn, Police Woman, The Rockford Files, Wagon Train, Baretta, The Untouchables, Johnny Staccato and Columbo. He also appeared in films such as Too Late Blues, Aloha Bobby and Rose, Raging Bull, King Kong, A Woman Under the Influence, The Laughing Policeman and Capone.

In 1976, Gallo co-starred in the new CBS drama television series Delvecchio, where he played the role of Sgt. Dominick Delvecchio's father Tomaso.

Death 
Gallo died in October 1984 of liver cancer at his home in Ontario, California, at the age of 61.

References

External links 

Rotten Tomatoes profile

1923 births
1984 deaths
Deaths from liver cancer
Deaths from cancer in California
People from Brooklyn
Male actors from New York (state)
American male film actors
American male television actors
20th-century American male actors
American people of Italian descent